Thành Trung is a rural commune of Bình Tân District in Vĩnh Long Province, Vietnam.

References

Communes of Vinh Long province
Populated places in Vĩnh Long province